Venice Biennale of Architecture (in Italian 
Mostra di Architettura di Venezia) is an international exhibition of architecture from nations around the world, held in Venice, Italy, every other year. It was held on even years until 2018, but 2020 was postponed to 2021 due to the COVID-19 pandemic shifting the calendar to uneven years. It is the architecture section under the overall Venice Biennale and was officially established in 1980, even though architecture had been a part of the Venice Art Biennale since 1968.

The main agenda of the Architecture Biennale is to propose and showcase architectural solutions to contemporary societal, humanistic, and technological issues. Although leaning towards the academic side of architecture, the Biennale also provides an opportunity for local architects around the world to present new projects. The Biennale is separated into two main sections: The permanent, national pavilions in the Biennale Gardens as well as the Arsenale, which hosts projects from numerous nations under one roof.



Exhibitions

2023 
The 18th Venice Architecture Biennale is curated by Lesley Lokko. The international architecture exhibition is entitled The Laboratory of the Future.

2021 
Curated by Hashim Sarkis, The 17th Venice Architecture Biennale was entitled How will we live together? Due to the COVID-19 pandemic, it took place in 2021 instead of 2020.

National pavilions, contributions and curators (selection)
Brazil: utopias of common life. Curated by Arquitetos Associados (Alexandre Brasil, André Luiz Prado, Bruno Santa Cecília, Carlos Alberto Maciel, Paula Zasnicoff) + Henrique Penha
Canada: Impostor Cities. Curated by Thomas Balaban, David Theodore, and Jennifer Thorogood.
 Germany: 2038. Curated by 2038.
 Great Britain: The Garden of Privatised Delights. Curated by Madeleine Kessler and Manijeh Verghese.
 Italy: Resilient Communities. Curated by Alessandro Melis.
 Poland: Trouble in Paradise. Curated by PROLOG +1.
Russian Federation: Open. Curated by Ippolito Pestellini Laparelli.
Scotland: What if...?/. Curated by 7N Architects and Architecture and Design Scotland
Spain: Uncertainty. Curated by Domingo J. González, Sofía Piñero, Andrzej Gwizdala, Fernando Herrera
 Turkey: Architecture as Measure. Curated by Neyran Turan.
United States of America: American Framing. Curated by Paul Andersen and Paul Preissner.
Awards

 Golden Lion for Best National Participation: United Arab Emirates, with Wetland. 
 Special mention as National Participation: Russia, with Open!
 Special mention as National Participation: Philippines, with Structures of Mutual Support. 

 Golden Lion for best participant in the exhibition How will we live together?: raumlaborberlin (Berlin, Germany), with Instances of Urban Practice. 
 Silver Lion for promising young participant in the exhibition How will we live together?: Foundation for Achieving Seamless Territory (FAST) (Amsterdam, The Netherlands; New York, USA), with Watermelons, Sardines, Crabs, Sands, and Sediments: Border Ecologies and the Gaza Strip. 

 Special Mention to the participant in the exhibition How will we live together?: cave_bureau (Nairobi, Kenya), with The Anthropocene Museum: Exhibit 3.0 Obsidian Rain. 

 Special Golden Lion for Lifetime Achievement: Lina Bo Bardi

2018 
The 16th International Architecture Exhibition was titled FREESPACE and was curated by Yvonne Farrell and Shelley McNamara.

National pavilions, contributions and curators (selection) 
Australia: Repair. Curated by Baracco+Wright Architects in collaboration with Linda Tegg.
Austria: Thoughts Form Matter. Curated by Verena Konrad.
China: Building a Future Countryside. Curated by Li Xiangning. 
Croatia: Cloud Pergola / The Architecture of Hospitality. Curated by Bruno Juričić.
Egypt: Robabecciah the informal city. Curated by Islam Elmashtooly and Mouaz Abouzaid. 
Indonesia: Sunyata: The Poetics of Emptiness. Curated by Ary Indrajanto, David Hutama, Adwitya Dimas Satria, Ardy Hartono, Jonathan Aditya Gahari, Johanes Adika Gahari. 
Italy: Arcipelago Italia. Curated by Mario_Cucinella.
Korea (Republic of): Spectres of the State Avant-garde. Curated by Seongtae Park. 
Lebanon: The Place That Remains. Curated by Hala Younes. 
Lithuania: The Swamp School. Curated by Nomeda & Gediminas Urbonas. 
Mexico: Echoes of a Land. Curated by Gabriela Etchegaray. 
Romania: Mnemonics. Curated by Romeo Cuc.  

Awards:

 Golden Lion for Best National Participation: Switzerland, with Svizzera 240, House Tour. Commissioners: Swiss Arts Council Pro Helvetia: Marianne Burki, Sandi Paucic, Rachele Giudici Legittimo. Curators & Exhibitors: Alessandro Bosshard, Li Tavor, Matthew van der Ploeg, Ani Vihervaara
 Special Mention for Best National Participation: Great Britain, with Island. Commissioner: Sarah Mann; Architecture Design Fashion British Council. Curators: Caruso St John Architects, Marcus Taylor
 Golden Lion for the best participant: Souto Moura - Arquitectos; Eduardo Souto de Moura (Porto, Portugal).
 Silver Lion for a promising young participant: Architecten de vylder vinck taillieu. Jan de Vylder, Inge Vinck, Jo Taillieu (Ghent, Belgium).
 Special Mentions: Andramatin; Andra Matin (Jakarta, Indonesia) and RMA Architects; Rahul Mehrotra (Mumbai, India; Boston, USA)
 Golden Lion for Lifetime Achievement: Kenneth Frampton (Great Britain)

2016 
The 15th International Architecture Exhibition, entitled Reporting from the Front was directed by Alejandro Aravena 28 May – 27 November. In his curation of the exhibition, Aravena foregrounded social housing, incremental housing, rural-urban relationships, the balance between technology and natural materials, and an attentiveness to manual labor and handicraft.

National pavilions, contributions and curators (selection) 
Italy: Taking Care. Curated by Studio Tamassociati
Scotland: Prospect North. Curated by Lateral North, Dualchas Architects and Soluis and Architecture and Design Scotland
Serbia: HEROIC: Free Shipping. Exhibitors: Stefan Vasic, Ana Šulkic and Igor Sjeverac.
Switzerland: Incidental Space. Curated by Sandra Oehy. Exhibitor Christian Kerez.

Awards:
 Golden Lion for Lifetime Achievement: Paulo Mendes da Rocha.
 Golden Lion for Best National Pavilion: Spain with Unfinished, curated by Iñaqui Carnicero and Carlos Quintáns.

2014
The 14th International Architecture Exhibition: Fundamentals. Directed by Rem Koolhaas. 7 June – 23 November 2014.

National pavilions, contributions and curators (selection) 

 Scotland: Critical Dialogues. Curated by Jonathan Charley, Judith Winter, Lottie Gerrard and Architecture and Design Scotland

Awards:
 Golden Lion for Lifetime Achievement: Phyllis Lambert.
 Golden Lion for Best National Participation: Korea, with "Crow's Eye View" curated by Minsuk Cho together with Hyungmin Pai and Changmo Ahn. 
Silver Lion for Best Research Project of the Monditalia section: Andrés Jaque and his Office for Political Innovation, with the project "Sales Oddity. Milano 2 and the Politics of Home to Home TV Urbanisms". 
 Silver Lion for Best National Participation: Chile, with "Monolith Controversies" curated by Pedro Alonso and Hugo Palmarola.
 Special Mentions to National Participations: Canada, France, Russia
 Special Mentions to research projects of the Monditalia section: "Radical Pedagogies: ACTION-REACTION-INTERACTION" by Beatriz Colomina, Britt Eversole, Ignacio G. Galán, Evangelos Kotsioris, Anna-Maria Meister, Federica Vannucchi, Amunátegui Valdés Architects, Smog.tv; "Intermundia" by Ana Dana Beroš; "Italian Limes" by Folder

2012

The 13th International Architecture Exhibition: Common Ground. Directed by David Chipperfield. 29 August – 25 November 2012.

National pavilions, contributions and curators (selection) 

 Scotland: Past + Future. Curated by Rem Koolhaas and Architecture and Design Scotland

Awards:
 Golden Lion for lifetime achievement: Alvaro Siza.
 Golden Lion for Best National Participation: Japan, "Architecture, possible here? Home-for-All" curated by Toyo Ito, with the participation of Kumiko Inui, Sou Fujimoto, Akihisa Hirata and Naoya Hatakeyama.
 Golden Lion for Best Project of the Common Ground Exhibition: Urban-Think Tank (Alfredo Brillembourg, Hubert Klumpner), Justin McGuirk and Iwan Baan
 Silver Lion for a promising practice of the Common Ground Exhibition: Grafton Architects (Yvonne Farrell and Shelley McNamara)
 Special Mentions: Poland, commissioner Hanna Wróblewska; United States of America, commissioner Cathy Lang Ho; Russia, commissioner Grigory Revzin; Cino Zucchi.

2010
The 12th International Architecture Exhibition: People meet in architecture. Directed by Kazuyo Sejima. 29 August – 21 November 2010.

Awards:
 Golden Lion for Lifetime Achievement: Rem Koolhaas
 Golden Lion for the Best National Participation: Kingdom of Bahrain
 Golden Lion for the Best Project in the People meet in architecture exhibition: junya.ishigami+associates
 Golden Lion in memoriam: Kazuo Shinohara
 Silver Lion for a promising young participant in the People meet in architecture exhibition: OFFICE Kersten Geers David Van Severen + Bas Princen
 Special Mentions: Amateur Architecture Studio, Studio Mumbai, Piet Oudolf

2008
The 11th International Architecture Exhibition: Out There: Architecture Beyond Building. Directed by Aaron Betsky. 14 September – 23 November 2008.

National pavilions, contributions and curators (selection) 
 Germany: Updating Germany  - 100 Projects for a Better Future. Curated by Friedrich von Borries and Matthias Böttger
 United States: Into the Open: Positioning Practice: 16 architectural groups focus on the increasing interest in civic engagement in American architectural practice, and examines the means by which a new generation is reclaiming a role in shaping community and the built environment. Curated by William Menking, Aaron Levy, and Andrew Sturm.

Awards:
 Golden Lion for Lifetime Achievement: Frank Gehry
 Golden Lion for Best National Participant: Poland ("Hotel Polonia. The Afterlife of Buildings"). A project by Nicolas Grospierre and Kobas Laksa
 Golden Lion for the Best Installation Project in the International Exhibition: Greg Lynn Form ("Recycled Toys Forniture")
 Special Golden Lion for lifetime achievement to a historian of Architecture: James S. Ackerman
 Silver Lion for a Promising Young Architect in the International Exhibition: Chilean Group Elemental

2006
The 10th International Architecture Exhibition: Cities, architecture and society. Directed by Ricky Burdett. 10 September – 19 November 2006. The collateral section City-Port was held in Palermo until January 14, 2007. The exhibition attracted over 130,000 visitors.

Awards:
 Golden Lion for Lifetime Achievement: Richard Rogers
 Golden Lion for Best National Participation: Denmark for "CO-EVOLUTION, Danish/Chinese collaboration on sustainable urban development in China". Curated by Henrik Valeur and UiD. Projects by Danish architectural offices and Chinese universities CEBRA + Tsinghua, COBE + CQU, Effekt + Tongji and Transform + XAUAT
 Golden Lion for the City: Bogotá, Colombia
 Golden Lion for Best Urban Projects: Javier Sanchez/ Higuera + Sanchez for the housing project "Brazil 44" in Mexico City
 Special prize for Best Architecture School: Facoltà di Architettura Politecnico di Torino for a project for Mumbai
 Mentions for three significant national exhibitions: Japan, Iceland and Macedonia
 Seven Stone Lions, Città di Pietra -Sensi Contemporanei section: Bari, group leader arch. Adolfo Natalini; Crotone, arch. Carlo Moccia; Pantelleria, group leader arch. Gabriella Giuntoli; Bari, group leader arch. Guido Canella; Bari, group leader arch. Antonio Riondino; Bari, group leader arch. Vitangelo Ardito; Pantelleria, group leader arch. Marino Narpozzi
 Prize for Architecture Portus, Città – Porto - Sensi Contemporanei section: "Il parco della Blanda" of Region Basilicata. Area: Maratea, Piana di Castrocucco (Potenza). Project by: Gustavo Matassa, with Vincenzo De Biase, Silvia Marano, Rosa Nave
 Premio Manfredo Tafuri, appointed by the Padiglione Italia: Vittorio Gregotti
 Giancarlo De Carlo prize, appointed by the Padiglione Italia: Andrea Stipa
 Ernesto Nathan Rogers prize, appointed by the Padiglione Italia: Luca Molinari

National pavilions, contributions and curators (selection) 
 United States Pavilion: 
After the Flood: Building on Higher Ground: Architectural responses to the August 2005 devastation in New Orleans and the Gulf Coast wrought by Hurricane Katrina. Curated by Christian Ditlev Bruun. Projects by Anderson+Anderson Architects and Eight Inc. were among the included projects. Photography for the exhibition by Michael Goodman. Graphic Design by Paula Kelly Design NYC. The exhibition traveled to Bangkok (2007), Panama City (2007), and Los Angeles (2008). The exhibition also marked the beginning of the international symposium series Sustainable Dialogues, which connected architects, city planners, and environmentalist from Southeast Asia, Central and South America with American architects in each region to exchange ideas and knowledge and propose solutions to issues of ecological disasters, global climate change, and sustainable architectural strategies. Collaborators included Global Green and Make it Right (founded by Brad Pitt).

2004
The 9th International Architecture Exhibition: METAMORPH. Directed by Kurt W. Forster. 12 September – 7 November 2004. The exhibition attracted over 115,000 visitors.

Awards:
 Golden Lion for Lifetime Achievement: Peter Eisenman
 Golden Lion for best installation presented by a country: Belgium Pavilion ("Kinshasa, the Imaginary City")
 Golden Lion for most significant work of the Metamorph exhibition: Studio SANAA by Kazuyo Sejima + Ryue Nishizawa for the project for the Museum of 21st century for contemporary art (Kanazawa, Japan) and for the enlargement of the Istituto Valenciano de Arte Moderna (Valencia, Spain)
 Special Prize for best work in the Concert Halls section: Studio Plot of Julien De Smedt and Bjarke Ingels for the Concert House project (Stavanger, Norvegia)
 Special Prize for best work in the Episodes section: German photographer Armin Linke and Italian architect Piero Zanini for the Alpi installation
 Special Prize for best work in the Transformations section: Austrian architect Günther Domenig for the Documentation Centre at the Party Rally Grounds of Norimberg, Germany
 Special Prize for best work in the Topography section: Studio Foreign Office Architects Ltd for the Novartis Car Park (Basilea, Switzerland)
 Special Prize for best work in the Surface section: Japanese architect Shuhei Endo for the Springtecture project (Singu-cho, Hyogo, Japan)
 Special Prize for best work in the Atmosphere section: Australian studio PTW Architects pty Ltd and Chinese partner studio CSCEC + Design for the National Swimming Center project (Pechino Olympic Green, China)
 Special Prize for best work in the Hyper-Project section: Martinez Lapeña- Torres Arquitectos for the Esplanada Fòrum (Barcelona, Spain)
 Special Prize for best work in the Morphing Lights, Floating Shadows sections (photography): images of Mars shot by NASA in cooperation with JPL and Cornell University

National pavilions, contributions and curators (selection) 
 United States Pavilion: Transcending Type. Featuring six U.S. architecture firms in the vanguard of contemporary design. Each explore new forms and uses for iconic modern building types. Commissioner: Architectural Record. Curated by Christian Ditlev Bruun. Projects exhibited: George Yu Architects, Los Angeles: SHOPPING CENTER. *Kolatan/MacDonald Studio, New York: RESIDENTIAL HIGH RISE (Resi-Rise) *Studio/Gang/Architects, Chicago: URBAN SPORTS ARENA. *Lewis.Tsurumaki.Lewis, New York: PARKING GARAGE. *Predock_Frane, Los Angeles: SPIRITUAL SPACE. *Reiser + Umemoto, New York: HIGHWAY INTERCHANGE

2002
The 8th International Architecture Exhibition: NEXT. Directed by Deyan Sudjic. 8 September – 3 November 2002. The exhibition attracted over 100,000 visitors.

Awards:
 Golden Lion for Lifetime Achievement: Toyo Ito
 Golden Lion for best project of the International Exhibition: Iberê Camargo Foundation di Porto Alegre (Brazil) designed by Alvaro Siza Vieira
 Special prize for best National Participant: Dutch Pavilion
 Special prize for best architectural works patron: Zhang Xin
 Special prize for best governative sponsorship : Barcelona
 Special mention to Next Mexico City: The Lakes Project

National pavilions, contributions and curators (selection) 
 United States Pavilion *World Trade Center. Two Perspectives: The Aftermath & Before. Photographs by Joel Meyerowitz. *A New World Trade Center Design Proposals. The Max Protetch Gallery.
Commissioner: Robert Ivy, Chief Executive Officer of the American Institute of Architects (AIA)

2000
The 7th International Architecture Exhibition: Less Aesthetics, More Ethics. Directed by Massimiliano Fuksas. 18 June – 29 October 2000.

Awards:
 Golden Lion for Lifetime Achievement: Renzo Piano, Paolo Soleri and Jørn Utzon.
 Golden Lion for best interpretation of the exhibition: Jean Nouvel
 Special prize for best National Participant: Spain
 Special "Bruno Zevi" prize for best architecture professor: Joseph Rykwert
 Special prize for best architectural works patron: Thomas Krens
 Special prize for best architecture editor: Eduardo Luis Rodriguez, editor of Arquitectura Cuba
 Special prize for best architecture photographer: Ilya Utkin

National pavilions, contributions and curators (selection) 
 United States Pavilion: ARCHitecture LABoratories with Columbia University and UCLA. Greg Lynn and Hani Rashid, respectively, transformed the U.S. Pavilion into a research laboratory designed to investigate, produce, and present a broad scope of new architectural schemes. A central theme of the studio program was new technology and its application to contemporary housing and other building archetypes. Organized by: The Solomon R. Guggenheim Foundation. Commissioner: Max Hollein

1996
The 6th International Architecture Exhibition: Sensing the Future—The Architect as Seismograph. Directed by Hans Hollein.

Awards:
 Golden Lion for best National Participant: Japan
 Golden Lion for best interpretation of exhibition: Odile Decq-Benoît Cornette, Juha Kaakko, Ilkka Laine, Kimmo Liimatainen, Jari Tirkkonen, Enric Miralles Moya
 Special Osella for an extraordinary initiative in contemporary architecture: Pascal Maragall, Mayor of  Barcelona
 Special Osella for media exposure in the field of contemporary architecture: Wim Wenders
 Special Osella for best architecture photographer: Gabriele Basilico

National pavilions, contributions and curators (selection) 
 United States Pavilion: Building a Dream: The Art of Disney Architecture. The Walt Disney Company has inspired and commissioned the work of many of the leading architects of our day for its hotels, productions, facilities, office buildings, sports facilities and housing developments. Organized by: Disney Imagineering, and The Solomon R Guggenheim Foundation, New York. Commissioner: Thomas Krens

1991
The 5th International Architecture Exhibition. Directed by Francesco Dal Co. 8 September – 6 October 1991.

Awards:
 Winner of the International contest for the new Palazzo del Cinema 1990: Rafael Moneo
 Winner of the International contest "Una Porta per Venezia" for the restoration of Piazzale Roma: Jeremy Dixon and Edward Jones

National pavilions, contributions and curators (selection) 
 United States Pavilion: "Peter Eisenman and Frank Gehry". The similarities and differences between the work of architects Peter Eisenman and Frank Gehry. Organized by: The Solomon R Guggenheim Foundation, New York. Commissioner: Philip Johnson

1986
The 4th International Architecture Exhibition: Hendrik Petrus Berlage—Drawings. Directed by Aldo Rossi. 18 July – 28 September 1986. Villa Farsetti, Santa Maria di Sala.

1985
The 3rd International Architecture Exhibition: Progetto Venezia (international competition). Directed by Aldo Rossi. 20 July – 29 September 1985.

Awards:
 Stone Lion: Robert Venturi, Manuel Pascal Schupp, COPRAT, Franco Purini (Accademia Bridge)
 Stone Lion: Raimund Abraham, Raimund Fein, Peter Nigst, Giangiacomo D’Ardia (Ca’ Venier dei Leoni)
 Stone Lion: Alberto Ferlenga (Piazza di Este)
 Stone Lion: Daniel Libeskind & Cranbrook Graduate Students, Three Lessons in Architecture (Piazza di Palmanova)
 Stone Lion: Laura Foster Nicholson (Villa Farsetti at Santa Maria di Sala)
 Stone Lion: Maria Grazia Sironi and Peter Eisenman (Castelli di Romeo and Juliet at Montecchio Maggiore)

1981-82
The 2nd International Architecture Exhibition: Architecture in Islamic Countries. Directed by Paolo Portoghesi. 20 November 1981 – 6 January 1982.

1980
The 1st International Architecture Exhibition: The presence of the Past. Directed by Paolo Portoghesi. 27 July – 20 October 1980.

Included the Strada Novissima exhibition at the Corderie dell'Arsenale, and exhibitions on Antonio Basile, the architect; The Banal Object. An Exhibition of Critics. An Exhibition of Young Architects. Homage to Gardella, Ridolfi and Johnson.

1979
Theatre of the World. The Dogana at the end of the Zattere, created by Aldo Rossi for the Architecture and Theatre Sections of the Biennale in occasion of the exhibition Venice and the Stage (winter 1979–80).

1978
Utopia and the Crisis of Anti-Nature. Architectural Intentions in Italy. Magazzini del Sale, Zattere. Director: Vittorio Gregotti.

1976
Werkbund 1907. The Origins of Design; Rationalism and Architecture in Italy during the fascist period; Europe-America, old city centre, suburbia; Ettore Sottsass, an Italian designer. Ca' Pesaro, San Lorenzo, Magazzini del Sale, Cini Foundation. Director. Vittorio Gregotti.

1975
On the subject of the Stucky Mill. Magazzini del Sale at the Zattere. Curated by the Visual Arts and Architecture Section of the Biennale, directed by Vittorio Gregotti.

See also
List of architecture prizes

References

Further reading

External links

Venice Biennale website
Satellite map of national pavilions

Culture in Venice
Exhibitions in Italy
Architecture festivals
Festivals established in 1980
Arts festivals in Italy
Festivals established in 1968
Architecture